Greenwood may refer to the following unincorporated communities in the U.S. state of Michigan:

 Greenwood, St. Clair County, Michigan
 Greenwood, Marquette County, Michigan
 Greenwood, Ogemaw County, Michigan

See also
 Greenwood Township, Michigan (disambiguation)
 Greenwoods, Michigan